Interior Lowlands is a description of a large region of mainly flat land and may refer to:

 Interior Lowlands of North America, see Geography of North America and Geography of the Interior United States
 Interior Lowlands of Australia, see Geography of Australia
 Interior Lowlands Located west of the Appalachian Highlands and east of the Great Plains
 Interior Lowlands Rolling flat lands with many rivers, broad river valleys and grassy hills
° Located in North America

See also 
Interior Plains